Deepa Malik (born 30 September 1970) is an Indian athlete. She started her career at the age of 30. She is the first Indian woman to win a medal in Paralympic Games and won a silver medal at the 2016 Summer Paralympics in shot put. 
She also won gold in the F-53/54 Javelin event at the para athletic Grand Prix held in Dubai in 2018. She is currently the world number one in the F-53 category.
She has won accolades for her participation in various adventure sports. She is associated with Himalayan Motorsports Association (H.M.A.) and Federation of Motor Sports Clubs of India (F.M.S.C.I.). It was – Raid De Himalaya. This journey covers many difficult paths including remote Himalayas, Leh, Shimla and Jammu.

She is a member of the working group in the formulation 12th five-year plan (2012–2017) on sports and physical education as nominated by the Planning Commission HRD Division on behalf of the Sports Ministry. She is also the 'Clean India' brand ambassador for NMDC and expert consultant for Disability Inclusive Accessible Infrastructure for the Ministry of Housing and Urban Affairs 'Smart Cities' project. In 2020, she was elected as President of the Paralympic Committee of India.

Achievements
Deepa Malik is the first Indian woman to win a medal at the Paralympics. She won the silver medal in the shot put in 2016 Paralympic Games. She was previously honored with the Arjuna award in 2012, at the age of 42 years. She has also been conferred the prestigious Padma Shri award in 2017. She created a New Asian Record in  Asian Para Games 2018 and is the only Indian woman to win medals in 3 consecutive Asian Para Games (2010, 2014, 2018). She has won 58 national and 23 international medals across all disciplines to date.

International participation and medals
Asian Para Games 2018, Jakarta 2018 | 2 Bronze Medals(3rd Position) - 1 Bronze F53/F54 Category (Javelin Throw), 1 Bronze F51/52/53 Category (Discus Throw)
Paralympic Games 2016, Rio 2016 | Silver Medal (2nd Position) - First Ever Indian Woman to win a Paralympic Medal (shot put)
IPC Athletics World Championship, Doha, Qatar 2015 | Diploma (5th Position) – (shot put)
IPC Oceania Asian Championship, Dubai, United Arab Emirates, March 2016 | 1 Gold (javelin), 1 Silver (shot put)
Won Incheon Asian Para Games 2014 – Silver medal in women's 53–54 Javelin with a new Asian Record and has now qualified to be at IPC World Athletics Championship Doha 2015 to be held in Oct 2015
IPC 2nd China Open Athletics Championship Beijing 10–17 April 2014– Shotput F53-55 Gold
German open athletics championship Berlin 2013 – IPC Qualification event – Only women from India to earn qualification for IPC world athletics championship Lyon 2013
IPC World Athletics Championship, Lyon 2013 – Diploma Position
First Malaysian Open Athletics Championship April 2012 – Two Gold Medals – (Javelin and discus) – New Official Asian Record In Javelin F-53 Women – Felicitated by Milkha Singh Ji and P.T.Usha Ji.
IWAS World Games Sharjah Dec-2011- Two Bronze Medals – Two New Asian Records
IPC World Athletics Championship Christchurch Jan 2011 – Silver Medal
IPC World Athletics Championship New Zealand 2011 – Only women para-athlete to qualify for the same *Commonwealth Games 2010 – Diploma Position – Shot Put
Para-Asian Games China Dec 2010 – Bronze Medal – First Ever Medal Won By A Woman Athlete at Asian Games
CP Sports Nottingham England Sep 2010 – Three Gold Medals – Shot-put, Discus, Javelin
IWAS World Games, India 2009– shot put- Bronze Medal
World Open Swimming Championship- Berlin 2008 – 10th Position S-5 Swimming Backstroke
IWAS World Games Taiwan- 2007 – Diploma Position – Javelin F53 Women
FESPIC Games Kuala Lumpur 2006 – 2ND Position S-5 Swimming Backstroke
Qualified B Level – Javelin Throw F-53 For Beijing Olympics 2008 – Felicitated By Mr. Kapil Dev
National and State level medals: 51 Gold, 5 Silver, 2 Bronze
International medals- 23

Motor sports 
Deepa Malik was the first person ever to receive a license for an invalid (modified) rally vehicle, a case she consistently pursued for 19 months in Maharashtra. She is also the first physically challenged individual in the country to receive an official rally license from the Federation Motor Sports Club of India (FMSCI) and become a navigator and driver in the toughest car rallies of the country- Raid-de-HIMALAYA 2009 and Desert Storm 2010.

Malik participated in the grid and national anthem ceremony at the start of the 2013 Indian Grand Prix at the Buddh International Circuit..

Her aim of joining motorsports is to spread awareness towards the fact that physically challenged individuals can obtain an official license and attain independence and self-reliance through driving. Deepa Malik has undertaken numerous rallies to promote this cause.

Early Life 
Malik was diagnosed with spinal tumore in 1999, and three gruelling surgeries later she was left Paralysed Waist down. She took life as it came and went on to open a Restaurant, become a swimmer, biker and also swam across Yamuna.

“I had fallen in love with Bikram because he was a biker,” Bikram was a young major in the Army with a fondness for bikes, soon they got married as Deepa's father was in Army at that time. Fondness for bikes made her fall in love with him.

Awards and recognition

National awards

President Role Model Award (2014)
Arjuna Award (2012)
Maharashtra Chhatrapati Award (sports) (2009–10)
Haryana Karambhoomi Award (2008)
Swawlamban Puruskar Maharashtra (2006)
Padma Shri Award (2017)
First Ladies Award - Ministry of Women & Child Development.
Major Dhyan Chand Khel Ratna Award (2019)

Other awards
WCRC Leaders Asia Excellence Award 2014
Limca people of the year award 2014
iCONGO Karamveer Puruskar 2014
Amazing Indian Awards Times Now-2013
Cavinkare National Ability Mastery Award −2013
Karamaveer Chakra award 2013
Nominee for L'Oreal Femina Awards 2013 in “Women We Love Category”
Batra Positive Health Hero Award 2012
AWWA Excellence Award For Sports 2012
Media Peace & Excellence Award For Sports 2012
Maharana Mewar Arawali Sports Award 2012
Misaal-e-Himmat Award (2012)
International Women's day appreciation Award 2011 – Cancer Patient Aid Association New Delhi.
Shree Shakti Puruskar CARE- 2011
District Sports Award Ahmednagar-2010
Rashtra Gaurav Puraskar 2009
Naari Gaurav Puraskar 2009
Guru Gobind Shaurya Puraskar 2009
Rotary Women Of The Year Award 2007

 For the silver medal at the 2016 Summer Paralympics
 from the Government of Haryana
 from the Ministry of Youth Affairs and Sports

Records and rankings 
 Holds An Official IPC Asian Record In Javelin F-53 Category – Felicitated by Milkha Singh and P.T.Usha.
 Holds All Three National Records In Throws {Discus, Javelin, Shot-put} In F-53 Category
 Holds All Three National Records In S-1 Swimming Category {Back Stroke, Breast Stroke, Free Style }
 World Ranking 2010–12 – 2nd Shot-put, 3rd -Discus, 3rd Javelin
 Asian Ranking 2010–12 – 1st In All Three Throws
LIMCA World Records
 Longest Pan-India drive done by a paraplegic women. Chennai-Delhi 3278 km – 2013
 Driving Across Nine High Altitude Passes in Nine Days on Leh-Ladakh Highest Motorable Roads. (First Woman in the world in her disability to attempt a journey like this – 2011)
 Riding Special Bike −2009
 Swimming in River Yamuna Against The Current For 1 km. Allahabad-2008

Public appearances 

 11 October 2019, On the occasion of International Day of the Girl Child, Deepa appeared on the popular Indian TV game show Kaun Banega Crorepati.

Political career 
Deepa Malik joined the BJP in shortly before the 2019 general election.

See also
Athletics at the 2010 Commonwealth Games – Women's shot put (F32–34/52/53)
2011 IPC Athletics World Championships – Women's discus throw
Athletics at the 2010 Asian Para Games
2011 IPC Athletics World Championships – Women's javelin throw
2011 IPC Athletics World Championships – Women's shot put

References

External links

How Deepa Malik Got Her Wheels Back by Snigdha Hasan

1970 births
Living people
Recipients of the Arjuna Award
Athletes (track and field) at the 2016 Summer Paralympics
Paralympic silver medalists for India
Indian female javelin throwers
21st-century Indian women
21st-century Indian people
Indian female shot putters
Athletes (track and field) at the 2010 Commonwealth Games
People from Sonipat district
Sportswomen from Haryana
Recipients of the Padma Shri in sports
Athletes from Haryana
Medalists at the 2016 Summer Paralympics
Paralympic medalists in athletics (track and field)
Paralympic athletes of India
Recipients of the Khel Ratna Award
Commonwealth Games competitors for India
FESPIC Games competitors
Wheelchair shot putters
Wheelchair javelin throwers
Paralympic shot putters
Paralympic javelin throwers